Patrick (Pat) Crain is a former American football fullback. He was drafted by the Chicago Bears in the 2nd round of the 1964 NFL Draft. He played college football at Clemson where he played fullback.  Some highlights of Crain's career include being selected to the 1963 all ACC team and being the only player in Clemson history to record a reception and an interception in a game until Justin Miller did it in 2002.

References

American football fullbacks
Chicago Bears players
Clemson Tigers football players
1940s births
Living people